FaithLife Financial, formerly the Lutheran Life Insurance Society of Canada, is a Christian fraternal benefit society which provides insurance and investment services to its members. Originally established to serve the Lutheran community, membership eligibility was expanded to all Christians in 2004.

History 

FaithLife Financial is a Fraternal Benefit Society and was founded in 1972, as Lutheran Life Insurance Society of Canada. The Society was sponsored by two competing American fraternal societies: Aid Association for Lutherans and Lutheran Brotherhood both of which had been operating in Canada since the late 1920s. The Canadian government granted Letters Patent (petition signing shown above) on June 28, 1972, to formally create Lutheran Life Insurance Society (the "Society"). On July 21, 1972, the Board of Directors enacted Bylaw Number One, which regulates the operation of Lutheran Life.

The Society began operations on January 2, 1973, from its Head Office on the 12th floor of the Marsland Centre in Waterloo, Ontario. On December 31, 1972, Aid Association for Lutherans and Lutheran Brotherhood withdrew from Canada. They provided $26.4 million in Canadian assets and more than $167 million of in force life insurance.

In August 1989 Society staff moved into the newly constructed head office located at 470 Weber Street N. Waterloo, Ontario.

The Society opened Membership to the broader Christian community in July 2004. To reflect its growing Christian membership, it adopted the trade name FaithLife Financial in March 2005. In December 2008, FaithLife Financial was officially adopted as the legal name.

Operations 

FaithLife Financial is licensed in British Columbia, Alberta, Saskatchewan, Manitoba, and Ontario.

References 

Philanthropic organizations based in Canada
Mutual organizations
Christian organizations established in 1972
1972 establishments in Ontario
Life insurance companies of Canada
Investment companies of Canada
Companies based in Waterloo, Ontario
Lutheranism in Canada